Beyond Order: 12 More Rules for Life is a 2021 self-help book by Canadian clinical psychologist, YouTube personality, and psychology professor Jordan Peterson, as a sequel to his 2018 book 12 Rules for Life. Beyond Order was released on 2 March 2021.

Overview

Background 
Peterson's original interest in writing his last book, 12 Rules for Life, grew out of a personal hobby of answering questions posted on Quora; one such question being, "What are the most valuable things everyone should know?", to which his answer comprised 42 rules.

Essentially psychological in their intention, the rules in both books are told using particular episodes of Peterson's clinical experience. Moreover, Peterson has stated that these rules were "explicitly formulated to aid in the development of the individual," though they may also prove useful at "levels of social organisation that incorporate the individual."

Peterson states that both books are predicated on the notion that chaos and order are "the two fundamental elements of reality", and that "people find meaning in optimally balancing them". The difference between the two books, according to Peterson, is that the first focuses "more on the dangers of an excess of chaos", while the second is more concerned "with the dangers of too much structure". Peterson says that 12 Rules "argues for the merits of a more conservative view of the world" while Beyond Order "argues for the merits of a more liberal view".

Writing 
While Peterson was writing the book, his wife was diagnosed with terminal kidney cancer, though she recovered. Additionally, drug treatments for his depression led to a benzodiazepine dependence for which he was treated in Russian and Serbian rehab facilities with ketamine and an induced coma. During the COVID-19 pandemic in 2020, his daughter reported that he had contracted COVID-19.

Publication 
In November 2020, shortly after the book's announcement, multiple staff at the Canadian division of Penguin Random House protested against the publication of the book. At least 70 anonymous messages were made to the publisher's diversity and inclusion committee, with "a couple" in favour of publishing.

Beyond Order was subsequently released in March 2021.

12 Rules 
The book comprises twelve chapters, the titles of which suggest "rules for life".

 "Do not carelessly denigrate social institutions or creative achievement."
 "Imagine who you could be and then aim single-mindedly at that."
 "Do not hide unwanted things in the fog."
 "Notice that opportunity lurks where responsibility has been abdicated."
 "Do not do what you hate."
 "Abandon ideology."
 "Work as hard as you possibly can on at least one thing and see what happens."
 "Try to make one room in your home as beautiful as possible."
 "If old memories still upset you, write them down carefully and completely."
 "Plan and work diligently to maintain the romance in your relationship."
 "Do not allow yourself to become resentful, deceitful, or arrogant."
 "Be grateful in spite of your suffering."

Reception 
Suzanne Moore of The Telegraph rated the book four out of five stars, saying that Peterson is "at his best when telling stories of his clinical practice" and finding the book, like its predecessor, "hokey wisdom combined with good advice". Moore also said that there was "not much here for women at all" nor any "real analysis of how power operates", and that "the rules are really nothing to argue about".

In a mostly negative review, James Marriott of The Times wrote: "Ideas that flit and glimmer in Peterson's videos look bloated and dead when strapped to the page." Believing Peterson to be famous for his personality rather than his "bonkers" philosophy, Marriott said that Peterson "may have mistaken his personality for a philosophical system", and said Peterson's Harry Potter analysis contained the "most entertaining absurdities" of the book.

In another mostly negative review, Andrew Anthony of The Guardian wrote: "Viewed in the most favourable light, Peterson's rules are an attempt to locate people within society, to acknowledge the systems and structures that have long existed and, instead of seeking to tear them down, encourage his readers to find their most functional position within them". Anthony criticised that "The problem arises when his ragbag of common sense dictums... are taken themselves to be a kind of gospel."

On the other hand, Larissa Nolan of The Independent called it "a psychology book on another plane, a self-help book de profundis, from a beautiful mind. That he wrote it during the greatest crisis of his life is a testament to the power of what he preaches."

In The Atlantic, Helen Lewis commented that Peterson's popularity is because of, not in spite of, "his contradictions and human frailties". Lewis wrote: "he is one of notably few prominent figures willing to confront the most fundamental questions of existence... He doesn't offer get-rich-quick schemes, or pickup techniques. He is not libertine or libertarian. He promises that life is a struggle, but that it is ultimately worthwhile."

References

Further reading 
Book excerpts
"Jordan Peterson: Become the Fool to overcome the most meagre of circumstances." National Post (2021 February 27).

Reviews
 Burkeman, Oliver. 2021 March 2. "Beyond Order by Jordan Peterson review – more rules for life." The Guardian.
 Jameson, Greg. 2021 March 2. "Jordan B Peterson – ‘Beyond Order 12 More Rules For Life' Review." Entertainment Focus.
 Lewis, Helen. 2021 March 2. "Review: 'Beyond Order,' by Jordan B. Peterson." The Atlantic (April 2021 issue).
 McDonagh, Melanie. 2021 February 26. "Beyond Order: 12 More Rules for Life by Jordan Peterson: the first review." The Evening Standard.
 "Beyond Order: More Rules for Life par Jordan Peterson Review [in French]." Marseille News. 2021 February 27.

External links 
 Peterson's website

2021 non-fiction books
English-language books
Canadian non-fiction books
Random House books
Penguin Press books
Philosophy books
Psychology books
Self-help books
Sequel books
Books by Jordan Peterson